Diego Corpache (born May 21, 1976) is an Argentine professional footballer who is currently an assistant manager for Veikkausliiga side TPS.

Corpache began his playing career in 1996 with Deportivo Español of the Primera División Argentina. He made his professional debut in a 1-1 draw against Belgrano de Córdoba on 7 April 1996. In 1998 Deportivo Español were relegated from the Primera División but Corpache remained with the club until 2000 when he moved to Finland to play for Inter Turku. After being released from Inter, he joined another Finnish Veikkausliiga club, FC Haka. After suffering a serious knee injury, Corpache announced his retirement from the game.

On 8 March 2010 it was announced that Corpache had joined Turun Palloseura's coaching staff as an assistant manager under the new manager Marko Rajamäki

References

Guardian Football
 BDFA profile
 Primera División Argentina statistics

1976 births
Living people
Footballers from Buenos Aires
Italian footballers
Argentine footballers
Argentine Primera División players
Veikkausliiga players
Deportivo Español footballers
FC Haka players
FC Inter Turku players
Argentine expatriate footballers
Expatriate footballers in Finland
Association football defenders